The New South Wales Anti-Discrimination Act 1977 is an Act of the NSW Parliament, relating to discrimination in employment, the public education system, delivery of goods and services, and other services such as banking, health care, property and night clubs.

The Act prohibits unlawful racial, sexual and other types of discrimination in certain circumstances and promotes equality of opportunity for all people

The Act covers the following types of discrimination: 
 Sex (including breastfeeding, pregnancy and sexual harassment)
 Disability (including past, present or future disability and also includes actual or perceived HIV status)
 Race (including ethno-religion)
 Homosexuality (actual or perceived)
 Marital or domestic status
 Age (present or future)
 Transgender (including transsexuality)
 Carer’s responsibilities (but only within employment).

Development of the NSW Anti-Discrimination Act 1977 
The Act was granted Royal Assent on 28 April 1977 and came into effect on 1 June 1977. It was the 48th Act of 1977. Since then the Act has been amended and reformed about 90 times.

Anti-Discrimination Board of NSW 
The Anti-Discrimination Board of NSW was set up under the NSW Anti-Discrimination Act 1977 to promote anti-discrimination and equal opportunity principles and policies throughout NSW and to administer the Act.

Functions of the Board 
The Anti-Discrimination Board of NSW handles complaints of discrimination made by members of the public, investigating and conciliating complaints when appropriate.

It also works to prevent discrimination by means of consultations, education programs, seminars, presentations, media and community engagement, and informational materials.

In addition, the Board advises the Government on discrimination matters and makes recommendations to the Attorney General on some applications for exemption from the Act.

Office of Director of Equal Opportunity in Public Employment 
The Office of Director of Equal Opportunity in Public Employment (ODEOPE) administrates Part 9A of the Act, which pertains to Equal Employment Opportunity (EEO) across the public sector.

Publicly threatening and inciting violence law 
In June 2018, both houses of the Parliament of New South Wales unanimously passed and the Governor of New South Wales signed an urgent bill without amendments called the Crimes Amendment (Publicly Threatening and Inciting Violence) Bill 2018 to repeal the 1989 vilification laws within the Anti-Discrimination Act 1977 and replace it with criminal legislation with up to an explicit 3 year term of imprisonment within this Act. The legislation went into effect on August 13, 2018 - by proclamation on August 10, 2018.

References

External links
 NSW Anti-Discrimination Act 1977
 Anti-Discrimination Board of NSW

1977 in Australian law
History of New South Wales
New South Wales legislation
Anti-discrimination law in Australia
1970s in New South Wales